Jimabad may refer to:
 Jimabad, Razavi Khorasan
 Jimabad, Birjand, South Khorasan Province
 Jimabad, Zirkuh, South Khorasan Province